Chenarestan-e Vosta (also Romanized as Chenārestān-e Vosţá; also known as Chenārestān-e Vasaţ) is a village in Sarrud-e Jonubi Rural District, in the Central District of Boyer-Ahmad County, Kohgiluyeh and Boyer-Ahmad Province, Iran. At the 2006 census, its population was 179, in 34 families.

References 

Populated places in Boyer-Ahmad County